In linguistics, an elision or deletion is the omission of one or more sounds (such as a vowel, a consonant, or a whole syllable) in a word or phrase. However, these terms are also used to refer more narrowly to cases where two words are run together by the omission of a final sound. An example is the elision of word-final /t/ in English if it is preceded and followed by a consonant: "first light" is often pronounced /fɜ:s laɪt/. Many other terms are used to refer to particular cases where sounds are omitted.

Citation forms and contextual forms
A word may be spoken individually in what is called the  citation form. This corresponds to the pronunciation given in a dictionary. However, when words are spoken in context, it often happens that some sounds that belong to the citation form are omitted. Elision is not an all-or-nothing process: elision is more likely to occur in some styles of speaking and less likely in others.  Many writers have described the styles of speech in which elision is most commonly found, using terms such as "casual speech", "spontaneous speech", "allegro speech" or "rapid speech". In addition, what may appear to be the disappearance of a sound may in fact be a change in the articulation of a sound that makes it less audible. For example, it has been said that in some dialects of Spanish the word-final -ado, as in cansado (tired) is pronounced /ado/ in citation form but the /d/ is omitted in normal speech, giving "cansao". More careful description will show that the Spanish phoneme /d/ is usually pronounced as a voiced dental fricative [ð] when it occurs between vowels. In casual speech it is frequently weakened to a voiced dental approximant [ð̞]. The most extreme possibility is complete elision resulting in a diphthong with no observable consonantal tongue gesture. In this view, elision is the final stage in lenition or consonant weakening, the last phase of a cline or continuum describable as d > ð > ð̞ > ∅. Whether the elision is of vowel or consonant, if it is consistent through time, the form with elision may come to be accepted as the norm: tabula > tabla as in Spanish, mutare > muer ("change, molt") in French, luna > lua ("moon") in Portuguese.
It is usual to explain elision and related connected-speech phenomena in terms of the principle of least effort or "economy of effort". This concept has been stated as "If a word or expression remains perfectly intelligible without a certain sound, people tend to omit that sound."

Historical elisions
There are various ways in which the present form of a language may reflect elisions that have taken place in the past. This topic is an area of Diachronic linguistics. Such elisions may originally have been optional but have over time become obligatory (or mandatory). In English, the word "cupboard" would originally have contained /p/ between /ʌ/ and /b/, but the /p/ is believed to have disappeared from the pronunciation of the word about the fifteenth century.

Contractions
In many languages there is a process similar but not identical to elision, called contraction, where common words that occur frequently together form a shortened pronunciation. This may be a historical case (for example, French "ce est" has become "c'est" /sɛ/ and it would now be incorrect to say "ce est" /sə ɛ/) or one that is still optional (in English, a speaker may say "that is" /ðæt ɪz/ or "that's" /ðæts/). Contractions of both sorts are natural forms of the language used by native speakers and are often colloquial but not considered substandard. English contractions are usually vowel-less weak form words. In some cases the contracted form is not a simple matter of elision: for example, "that's" as a contraction is made not only by the elision of the /ɪ/ of "is" but also by the change of final consonant from /z/ to /s/;  "won't" for "will not" requires not only the elision of the /ɒ/ of "not" but also the vowel change /ɪ/ → /oʊ/ and in English RP "can't" and "shan't" change vowel from /æ/ of "can" and "shall" to /ɑː/ in /kɑːnt/, /ʃɑːnt/. In some languages employing the Latin alphabet, such as English, the omitted letters in a contraction are replaced by an apostrophe (e.g., isn't for is not). Written Greek marks elisions in the same way.

Elision in poetry

Elision is frequently found in verse. It is sometimes explicitly marked in the spelling, and in other cases has to be inferred from knowledge of the metre. Elisions occurred regularly in Latin, but were not written, except in inscriptions and comedy. Elision of a vowel before a word starting in a vowel is frequent in poetry, where the metre sometimes requires it. For example, the opening line of Catullus 3 is Lugete, O Veneres Cupidinesque, but would be read as Lugeto Veneres Cupidinesque (audio). There are many examples of poetic contraction in English verse of past centuries marked by spelling and punctuation. Frequently found examples are over > o'er and ever > e'er. Multiple examples can be seen in lines such as the following from Elegy Written in a Country Churchyard by Thomas Gray, published in 1751:

Th' applause of list'ning senates to command
He gain'd from heav'n ('twas all he wish'd) a friend

Deletion
The term deletion is used in some modern work instead of elision. When contemporary or historic deletion is treated in terms of Generative phonology it is usual to explain the process as one of substituting zero for a phoneme, in the form of a phonological rule. The form of such rules is typically

 X --> ∅ (i.e. the segment x becomes zero)

An example of a deletion rule (for /r/-deletion in English RP) is provided by Giegerich. If we start with the premise that the underlying form of the word "hear" has a final /r/ and has the phonological form /hɪər/, we need to be able to explain how /r/ is deleted at the end of "hear" but is not deleted in the derived word "hearing". The difference is between word-final /r/ in "hear", where the /r/ would form part of the rhyme of a syllable, and word-medial /r/ which would form the onset of the second syllable of "hearing". The following rule deletes /r/ in "hear", giving /hɪə/, but does not apply in the case of "hearing", giving /hɪərɪŋ/.
                 rhyme
     /r/ --> ∅/  _

Writing

Even though the effort that it takes to pronounce a word does not have any direct influence on writing, a word or phrase may be spelled in a way that reflects elisions. This happens in poetry, as explained above, and in drama in order to reflect the presence of elisions or non-standard speech forms. The term eye dialect is sometimes used to refer to this practice.

Examples

English

Examples of elision in English:

Most elisions in English are not mandatory, but they are used in common practice and even sometimes in more formal speech. This applies to nearly all the examples in the above table. However, these types of elisions are rarely shown in modern writing and never shown in formal writing. In formal writing, the words are written the same whether or not the speaker would elide them, but in many plays and classic American literature, words are often written with an elision to demonstrate accent:

Other examples, such as him and going to shown in the table above, are generally used only in fast or informal speech. They are still generally written as is unless the writer intends to show the dialect or speech patterns of the speaker.

The third type of elision is in common contractions, such as can't, isn't, or I'm. The apostrophes represent the sounds that are removed and are not spoken but help the reader to understand that it is a contraction and not a word of its own. These contractions used to be written out when transcribed (i.e. cannot, is not, I am) even if they were pronounced as a contraction, but now they are always written as a contraction so long as they are spoken that way. However, they are by no means mandatory and a speaker or writer may choose to keep the words distinct rather than contract them either as a stylistic choice, when using formal register, to make meaning clearer to children or non-native English speakers, or to emphasize a word within the contraction (e.g. I am going!)

In non-rhotic accents of English,  is dropped unless it's followed by a vowel, making cheetah and cheater completely homophonous.

Finnish
The consonant in the partitive case ending  elides when it is surrounded by two short vowels except when the first of the two vowels involved is paragoge (added to the stem). Otherwise, it stays. For example,  → ,  → , but  →  (not a short vowel),  →  (consonant stem),  →  (paragogic  on a consonant stem).

French

Elision of unstressed vowels (usually ) is common in the French language and, in some cases, must be indicated orthographically with an apostrophe.

Elision of vowel and consonant sounds was also an important phenomenon in the phonological evolution of French. For example, s following a vowel and preceding another consonant regularly elided, with compensatory lengthening of the vowel.
Latin  → Old French  → Modern French 
Latin  → Old French  → Modern French 
Latin  → Old French  → Modern French

German

The final  of a noun is also elided when another noun or suffix is concatenated onto it:  +  becomes .

In both of the above cases, the  represents a schwa.

Icelandic

Elision is common in Icelandic. There are a variety of rules for its occurrence, but the most notable is the loss of trailing consonants in common particles as well as the merger of similar vowel sounds. The pronunciation of the full word tends to lay emphasis on it ("What is this?") while the elision of the word leads to its deemphasis ("What is this?").

Irish

Elision is found in the Ulster dialect of Irish, particularly in final position. , for example, while pronounced  in the Conamara dialect, is pronounced  in Ulster.  is also elided when it begins intervocalic consonant clusters.  is pronounced ;  is pronounced .

Japanese

Elision is extremely common in the pronunciation of the Japanese language. In general, a high vowel ( or ) that appears in a low-pitched syllable between two voiceless consonants is devoiced and often deleted outright. However, unlike French or English, Japanese does not often show elision in writing. The process is purely phonetic and varies considerably depending on the dialect or level of formality. A few examples (slightly exaggerated; apostrophes added to indicate elision):

松下さんはいますか？ Matsushita-san wa imasu ka? ("Is Mr. Matsushita in?")
Pronounced: matsush'tasanwa imas'ka

失礼します Shitsurei shimasu ("Excuse me")
Pronounced: sh'tsureishimas' 

Gender roles also influence elision in Japanese. It is considered masculine to elide, especially the final u of the polite verb forms (-masu, desu), but women are traditionally encouraged to do the opposite. However, excessive elision is generally associated with lower prestige, and inadequate elision is seen as overly fussy or old-fashioned. Some nonstandard dialects, such as Satsuma-ben, are known for their extensive elision.

It is common for successive o sounds to be reduced to a single o sound, as is frequently encountered when the particle を (wo/o) is followed by the beautifying or honorific お (o).

Latin
Latin poetry featured frequent elision, with syllables being dropped to fit the meter or for euphony. Words ending in vowels would elide with the following word if it started with a vowel or h; words ending with -m would also be elided in the same way (this is called ecthlipsis). In writing, unlike in Greek, this would not be shown, with the normal spelling of the word represented. For instance, line 5 of Virgil's Aeneid is written as "", even though it would be pronounced as "".

Other examples of elision in Latin literature include:

Virgil's Aeneid Book I, Line 3: " "  is pronounced " ", where " " comprises three long syllables, or one and a half spondees.
Virgil's Aeneid Book I, Line 11: " "  is pronounced " ", where " " comprises three long syllables and two short syllables.
Ovid's Metamorphoses Book III, Line 557: " " is pronounced " ", where " " comprises two short syllables and a long syllable.
Ovid's Amores Book III, Poem VI, Line 101: " " is pronounced " ".
 Catullus 73 line 6, "", has elision connecting the final six words together.
 Caecilius Statius's Ephesio (quoted in Cicero's Cato Maior de Senectute 25) has the line: "" where there is elision between every word.
 A line from Lucilius (600 Marx; 728 Warmington) similarly has elision connecting all its words: "".

Malayalam

Dropping sounds in connected speech by native speakers is very common in this language from Kerala, southern India. For example, entha becomes ntha and ippol becomes ippo.

Spanish

The change of Latin into the Romance languages included a significant amount of elision, especially syncope (loss of medial vowels). Spanish has these examples:

 from Latin 
 from Latin  (through )
 from Latin  (with dissimilation of -nm- to -lm-)
 from Latin  (with lenition of f- to h- to ∅, dissimilation of -mn- to -mr- and then epenthesis of -mr- to -mbr-)
In addition, speakers often employ crasis or elision between two words to avoid a hiatus caused by vowels: the choice of which to use depends upon whether or not the vowels are identical.

Tamil
Tamil has a set of rules for elision. They are categorised into classes based on the phoneme where elision occurs:

Urdu 
In Pakistan, elision has become very common in speech. Commonly used words have single consonants or syllables removed in casual speech and it is becoming more acceptable in formal settings due to an increasing understandability and use. Although not seen when writing in the Urdu script (Nastaleeq), it is often seen in Roman Urdu (Latin alphabet) as the latter is more similar to vernacular Urdu. Most elisions occur by removing a vowel or the consonant /h/ or a combination of the two. Some widely-used examples are:

(The difference between the elision May and the original word Main is the lack of nasalization at the end in the former.)

In sentences, they may appear as:

Kya tum paṛ ray o? ("Are you studying?") instead of "Kya tum paṛh rahay ho?"

Variations are also common where some individuals may prefer to pronounce a complete word such as "paṛh" while shortening the rest, depending on the preference of the person, their dialect, or their accent.

Welsh
Elision is a major feature of Welsh, found commonly in verb forms, such as in the following examples:
 - 'Do you like the coffee?' (The definitite article is always  after a vowel even when the next word begins with a consonant, e.g.  - 'the cat is scratching', but  - 'the black cat'.
 -  'Where is the town?'
 - 'I am reading'

Elision of word-final  is almost always found in spoken Welsh to the point where the words are spelt with optional final  in words like  and has been eradicated from the inflected prepositions: , not * - 'on me', etc. These always retain their final  in the literary register, however.

Welsh also displays elision of initial syllables in singular/plural or collective/singulative pairs where the plural or singulative becomes longer than two syllables. This, however, is now restricted to specific nouns and is not productive. E.g.  - 'sock / socks' where the initial  has been lost in the plural;  - 'birds / a bird' where the initial  has been lost in the singulative.

Related areas

Aphaeresis
Apocope
Clipping (morphology)
Cluster reduction
Contraction
Crasis
Disemvoweling
Elision in the French language
Lacuna
Poetic contraction
Prodelision
Sandhi
Synaeresis
Synalepha
Syncope
Synizesis
Vowel reduction
Weak form words

References

General references

External links

French examples (contains pop-up ad)
Greek Grammar
Putting Words Together
List of words said with Relaxed Pronunciation - also includes contractions

Figures of speech
Phonology
Poetic devices
Prosody (linguistics)